Nasonovo is a rural locality (a village) in Kharovskoye Rural Settlement, Kharovsky District, Vologda Oblast, Russia. The population was 11 as of 2002.

Geography 
Nasonovo is located 18 km southwest of Kharovsk (the district's administrative centre) by road. Bekrenikha is the nearest rural locality.

References 

Rural localities in Kharovsky District